Preacher's Kid is a 2021 extended play released by Semler that focuses on being a queer  Christian. In February 2021, it was the top Christian album on the iTunes charts.

Background
Before she recorded Preacher's Kid, Semler made a documentary about the Christian music industry. In an interview with a recording executive, she asked about including queer Christian artists, but she was told that the subject doesn't come up. In an interview with Michel Martin of NPR, she said that she chose to categorize the album as a Christian album because "I have a lived Christian experience. My faith is deeply important to me. And there's a pluralism of beliefs within Christianity, within that umbrella. And we know that to be true. But yet, within the genre of music, of Christian music, it's just so homogenous." 

Semler recorded the album using her laptop and a USB microphone.

Track listing

References

Christian rock EPs
LGBT-related albums
2021 EPs